Carrie Englert or Carrie Englert Zimmerman (born November 28, 1957) was the United States gymnastics champion in floor exercise and balance beam in 1976, and a competitor in the 1976 Olympic Games in women's gymnastics.

References

External links 
 Gymn Forum's biography on Carrie Englert
 Hickok Sports, Sports History - U.S. Gymnastics Champions
 Tallahassee Tumbling Tots' Olympians
 City of Tallahassee, Gymnastics
 Roll of Honour at the Games of the XXIst Olympiad

1957 births
Living people
Olympic gymnasts of the United States
American female artistic gymnasts
Gymnasts at the 1976 Summer Olympics
Leon High School alumni
21st-century American women